Too Late to Die Young is an album by Departure Lounge, released in 2002 on Bella Union Records.  It was the band's third and last album.  The album was produced by French DJ and remixer Kid Loco.

Track listing
"Straight Line To The Kerb"
"What You Have Is Good"
"King Kong Frown"
"I Love You"
"Alone Again And..."
"Tubular Belgians In My Goldfield"
"Be Good To Yourself"
"Over The Side"
"Coke And Flakes"
"Silverline"
"Animals On My Mind"

Credits
Producer - Kid Loco
Engineer – Nick Hannan
Assistant engineer – Pete Collis
Mix - Kid Loco, Nick Hannan

References

External links
Pitchfork review of the album
 Another review

Too Late To Die Young
2002 albums
Bella Union albums